E-government Development Center is a public legal entity that provides governmental e-services to citizens and non-citizens. The Center is subordinated to State Agency for Public Service and Social Innovations. The service utilizes digital technologies and establishes e-government to make state services operate more efficiently, ensure service availability, and improve citizen's living standards.

History 
The service was set up by presidential Decree No.1885 named “About e-government development and measures related to the transition to digital government” dated March 14, 2018.

Public legal entity 'Center for e-Government Development' under the State Agency for Citizen Service and Social Innovation under the President of the Republic of Azerbaijan reorganized to merge with the Agency for Innovation and Digital Development under the Ministry of Digital Development and Transport of the Republic of Azerbaijan.

Activities 
Information exchange among governmental entities and e-Services is implemented by the E-Government Development Center via the “e-Gov” portal. Electronic government services, services related to online visa issuance and digital payment systems are its major activities. The center helps digitize relations between citizens, businesses and government agencies. It operates based on a single-window system. In accordance with presidential Decree No.263 signed on September 12, 2018, the service implements projects on three primary projects. It monitors, analyzes and prepares budgets. Centralized electronic services are provided in these areas.

Projects 
The service monitors the performance of the ASAN Payment, ASAN Visa, ASAN Wi-Fi, ASAN Finance and other relevant projects.

E-Government Portal 
The Portal started to operate under State Agency for Public Service and Social Innovations under the President of the Republic of Azerbaijan according to Decree No.1885.

E-Governmental Portal is mainly responsible for applying single window system principles to give citizens access to government agencies.

G2C, B2C, and G2B services are implemented by the service and available any time for both entrepreneurs, the state agencies.

ASAN Payment 
ASAN payment started to function by Decree signed on February 11, 2015 No.463.  The system allows citizens to pay fines, fees, leasing and other obligations.

ASAN Visa 
ASAN Visa was established on the basis of Decree No. 923, signed on June 1, 2016.

ASAN Visa simplifies the visa issuance procedure for non-citizens who want to visit the country.

The system operates in two directions:

 Provision of electronic visas through the electronic visa portal: www.evisa.gov.az
 Provision of visas at International Airports located within Azerbaijan

International relations 
The service cooperates with Türksat (the satellite operator of the Republic of Turkey), the Government Digital Service (the national digital infrastructure in the United Kingdom), the Turkish Cooperation and Coordination Agency (TİKA), and the Ministry of the Interior and Safety (South Korea).

References

External links 

 Innovation and Digital Development Agency

Government agencies of Azerbaijan
Government of Azerbaijan